Fabian Christopher White Jr. (born November 29, 1998) is an American professional basketball player for the South Bay Lakers of the NBA G League. He played college basketball for the Houston Cougars.

High school career 
White began his high school career at Kingwood High School in Houston, Texas. He arrived as a promising basketball player and was moved to varsity games from the junior varsity team. White transferred to Atascocita High School in Atascocita, Texas, after his freshman year. He was regarded for his dunking and rebounding abilities. White was recruited by Houston Cougars head coach Kelvin Sampson who frequented his high school games.

College career 
White became a key player for the Cougars when he joined the team in the 2017–18 season. He was selected to the American Athletic Conference (AAC) All-Rookie team in 2018. White had increased his scoring and rebounding averages for each of his first three seasons.

On May 27, 2020, it was announced that White would miss the 2020–21 season after he tore his anterior cruciate ligament (ACL) during a solo workout. He returned to the lineup in February 2021 and provided a boost to the team as they made the Final Four of the 2021 NCAA Division I men's basketball tournament.

White scored 20 points as he led the Cougars to victory in the 2022 AAC basketball tournament and was named most outstanding player of the tournament. He averaged 12.5 points per game during his senior season and was selected to the All-AAC first team. White concluded his Cougars career with a program-record 122 wins.

Professional career

South Bay Lakers (2022–present)
White worked out for eight National Basketball Association (NBA) teams before the 2022 NBA draft but went undrafted. On July 24, 2022, he signed with the Los Angeles Lakers. On September 25, 2022, White was waived by the Lakers. On November 3, 2022, White was named to the opening night roster for the South Bay Lakers.

Career statistics

College

|-
| style="text-align:left;"|2017–18
| style="text-align:left;"|Houston
| 35 || 0 || 16.5 || .560 || – || .714 || 3.9 || .7 || .4 || .9 || 5.4
|-
| style="text-align:left;"|2018–19
| style="text-align:left;"|Houston
| 32 || 21 || 18.4 || .457 || .000 || .672 || 4.0 || .7 || .4 || .6 || 6.3
|-
| style="text-align:left;"|2019–20
| style="text-align:left;"|Houston
| 31 || 31 || 23.7 || .472 || .000 || .797 || 5.5 || .8 || .5 || .5 || 9.3
|-
| style="text-align:left;"|2020–21
| style="text-align:left;"|Houston
| 13 || 0 || 15.6 || .508 || .400 || .700 || 4.1 || .8 || .4 || .8 || 6.2
|-
| style="text-align:left;"|2021–22
| style="text-align:left;"|Houston
| 38 || 38 || 27.8 || .491 || .371 || .688 || 5.7 || 1.2 || 1.0 || 1.4 || 12.5
|- class="sortbottom"
| style="text-align:center;" colspan="2"|Career
| 149 || 90 || 21.2 || .490 || .364 || .715 || 4.7 || .9 || .6 || .9 || 8.3

References

External links
 Houston Cougars bio

1998 births
Living people
American men's basketball players
Basketball players from Houston
Forwards (basketball)
Houston Cougars men's basketball players